A term limit is a legal restriction that limits the number of terms an officeholder may serve in a particular elected office. When term limits are found in presidential and semi-presidential systems they act as a method of curbing the potential for monopoly, where a leader effectively becomes "president for life". This is intended to protect a republic from becoming a de facto dictatorship. Term limits may be applied as a lifetime limit on the number of terms an officeholder may serve, or the restrictions may be applied as a limit on the number of consecutive terms they may serve.

History

Europe

Term limits date back to Ancient Greece and the Roman Republic, as well as the Republic of Venice. In ancient Athenian democracy, many officeholders were limited to a single term. Council members were allowed a maximum of two terms. The position of Strategos could be held for an indefinite number of terms. In the Roman Republic, a law was passed imposing a limit of a single term on the office of censor. The annual magistrates, including the tribune of the plebs, the aedile, the quaestor, the praetor, and the consul, were forbidden reelection until a number of years had passed. The office of dictator was nearly unrestricted with the exception that it was limited to a single six month term. Successive Roman leaders weakened this restriction until Julius Caesar became a perpetual dictator and ended the republic.

Term limits returned in Medieval Europe through the Novgorod Republic, the Pskov Republic, the Republic of Genoa, and the Republic of Florence.

The first modern constitutional term limit was established in the French First Republic by the Constitution of 1795, which established five-year terms to the French Directory and banned consecutive terms. Napoleon ended the practice of term limits in 1799 in much the same way as Julius Caesar had. The French Constitution of 1848 reestablished term limits, but this was abolished by Napoleon's nephew, Napoleon III.

Many post-Soviet republics established presidential systems with five-year term limits after the dissolution of the Soviet Union in 1991. The President of Russia is allowed a maximum of two consecutive terms, but the 2020 amendments to the Constitution of Russia made President Vladimir Putin exempt from this limit. The President of Belarus was limited to two terms, but the limit was abolished in 2004.

United States 

A predecessor of modern term limits in the Americas dates back to the 1682 Pennsylvania Charter of Liberties and the colonial frame of government of the same year, authored by William Penn and providing for triennial rotation of the Provincial Council, the upper house of the colonial legislature. Presidents of the United States typically honored an informal tradition of only serving two terms in office, but this limit was not enshrined into law until the 22nd Amendment to the Constitution was ratified in 1951 after Franklin D. Roosevelt was elected to an unprecedented third and fourth terms.

Latin America 
As the countries of Latin America modeled presidential republics after the government of the United States in the 19th century, they established term limits for their presidents based on two-term precedent of the United States. In response to presidents overstaying their term, some of these term limits were eventually replaced by a limit of one term without reelection.

In Mexico, Porfirio Díaz evaded term limits, running for eight terms before being forced into exile in 1911. A new constitution in 1917 established a limit to one term. After Álvaro Obregón violated this law and ran for a second term, he was assassinated. Currently, members of the Congress of Mexico cannot be reelected for the next immediate term under article 50 and 59 of the Constitution of Mexico, and the President of Mexico is limited to a single six-year term, called the Sexenio.

The President of Argentina was limited to one consecutive six-year term, but the Constitution of Argentina was amended in 1994, loosening the term limit to a maximum of two consecutive four-year terms.

In 1997, the Constitution of Brazil was amended, loosening the term limit for the President of Brazil from one five-year term to two four-year terms.

In 2004, the term limit for the President of Colombia was increased from one term to two terms.

The 2009 Venezuelan constitutional referendum abolished term limits in Venezuela.

Asia 
Following the 1911 Revolution, Prime Minister of the Imperial Cabinet Yuan Shikai became the second President of the Republic of China. He was initially subject to a maximum of two five-year terms, but the term was then lengthened to ten years and the term limit was removed.

In 1948, the Temporary Provisions against the Communist Rebellion abolished the term limit for the President of the Republic of China and established Chiang Kai-shek as the country's military leader. The term limit was restored after the provisions were repealed in 1991.

The President of South Korea was initially permitted to serve a maximum of two four-year terms when the office was created in 1948, but the term limit was removed in 1954 so that Syngman Rhee could run for a third term. After Rhee was elected to a fourth term, the First Republic of Korea was overthrown. The two term limit was restored, but it was expanded to three terms in 1969 and abolished again in 1972. Since 1981, the President of South Korea has been limited to one five year term.

Under the original Constitution of Indonesia the presidential and vice-presidential terms were unlimited but since the first amendment in 1999 holders of both offices are limited to two terms each.

The Philippines established term limits following independence from the United States, but they were abolished by Ferdinand Marcos in the 1970s.

Between 1982 and 2018, the Constitution of China stipulated that the president, vice president, premier, vice premiers could not serve more than two consecutive terms, though there was no term limit for the General Secretary of the Chinese Communist Party, who usually represented the Paramount leader of China. In March 2018, the National People's Congress passed a set of constitutional amendments including removal of term limits for the president and vice president, as well as enhancing the central role of the Chinese Communist Party (CCP), allowing CCP leader Xi Jinping to retain power indefinitely until his death.

The President of Tajikistan was initially limited to one five-year term under the 1994 Constitution of Tajikistan. This was increased to one seven-year term in 1999 and to two seven-year terms in 2003. The term limit was reset for President Emomali Rahmon in 2006, and the term limit was abolished in 2016.

The Prime Minister of Pakistan was limited to one five-year term until the limit was abolished in 2011.

Term limits were one of the major demands of protesters during the Arab Spring.

Sub-Saharan Africa 
Liberia briefly limited its presidents to an eight-year term between 1944 and 1951.  As the countries of sub-Saharan Africa were decolonised in the mid-20th century, most of the new governments established presidential systems, but term limits were rarely established. The Democratic Republic of the Congo, Gabon, Rwanda, and Togo were the only countries to establish them, but they were abolished soon afterward. After the dissolution of the Soviet Union in 1991, many African countries were freed from Soviet control and established term limits.

The President of Uganda was limited to two five-year terms in 1995. President Yoweri Museveni had previously served two terms, but these were not counted toward the new two term limit. The term limit was abolished in 2005, allowing Museveni to continue as president.

In Kenya, the 2010 constitution limits the president to a maximum of two five-year terms just like county governors. Before the promulgation of the 2010 constitution, term limits did not exist. The first president, Mzee Jomo Kenyatta ruled for 15 years and died in office. His vice president, Daniel Moi took over in 1978 and ruled for 24 years before Mwai Kibaki took over. Kibaki ruled for ten years, in a tenure that was characterized by major political reforms leading to the 2010 constitution. Immediate former President Uhuru Kenyatta was the first president under the new law, a position he served for two terms of 5 years each and was succeeded by his deputy William Ruto in September 2022. A member of President Ruto's United Democratic Alliance party revealed plans to scrap the term limits on 7th November 2022 but the leadership dismissed him saying that was his personal opinion which he was entitled to.

In the Sub-Saharan Africa, only Kenya has experienced smooth transition of power from one president to another after the expiry of term limits. Some countries either scrap the requirement or do not have it in their laws.

Middle East and North Africa 
The 2019 Egyptian constitutional referendum expanded the presidential term from four to six years and allowed President Abdel Fattah el-Sisi to serve as President of Egypt for a third term over the constitutional limit of two terms.

Mechanism

Term limits are an element of constitutionalism that serves to limit the negative effects of democracy.

Term limits may take the form of consecutive term limits or lifetime term limits. With consecutive term limits, an officeholder can only serve a certain number of terms before they have to stop running for that office. After a set period of time, the clock resets on the limit, and the officeholder may run for election to their original office and serve up to the limit again. With lifetime limits, once an officeholder has served up to the limit, they may never again run for election to that office. Lifetime limits are much more restrictive than consecutive limits.

Countries that operate a parliamentary system of government are less likely to employ term limits on their leaders. This is because such leaders rarely have a set "term" at all: rather, they serve as long as they have the confidence of the parliament, a period which could potentially last for life. Many parliaments can be dissolved for snap elections which means some parliaments can last for mere months while others can continue until their expiration dates. Nevertheless, such countries may impose term limits on the holders of other offices—in republics, for example, a ceremonial presidency may have a term limit, especially if the office holds reserve powers.

Due in part to a lack of legal term limits in African countries, Mo Ibrahim created the Ibrahim Prize with an associated cash prize to incentivize African leaders to promote human rights and democratic transfer of power.

Violation of term limits 

Many presidents have tried to overstay their respective term limits by various methods. Between 1960 and 2010, more than one quarter of term-limited presidents successfully extended or violated their term limits to stay in power, and the enforcement of term limits is recognized as one of the great challenges in democratic development. Term limits typically receive greater domestic and international recognition than other mechanisms of democracy, and attempts to violate term limits are typically met with strong resistance by a country's population and on the world stage. The violation of term limits is strongly correlated with democratic backsliding and the erosion of human rights.

Whether a president seeks to subvert term limits may be affected by how much wealth can be gained from the office, opportunities for acquiring wealth after leaving office, what constraints are in place to enforce term limits, how much control leader has over other branches of government or a political party, precedent in the region, and the likelihood of facing criminal prosecution upon leaving office. Presidents are more likely to be successful in violating term limits if they control the other branches of government, whether through their political parties or through insufficient checks and balances. Though violation of term limits is more common in less democratic countries, political opposition, foreign governments, and the citizenry can still enforce term limits in nondemocratic countries.

A president may attempt to circumvent term limits indirectly by extending their rule without an additional term. This may be done by extending the length of the term or postponing elections. In some cases, a president may circumvent term limits by officially stepping down from office but maintaining de facto control of the government.

See also 
 List of political term limits
 Reelection
 Term of office

References

Bibliography

External links
 Real Term Limits: Now More Than Ever, an article by Doug Bandow in favor of term limits
 , term limits information from the National Conference of State Legislatures

Electoral restrictions
Term of office